Open theism, also known as openness theology and free will theism, is a theological movement that has developed within Christianity as a rejection of the synthesis of Greek philosophy and Christian theology. Open theism arises out of the free will theistic tradition of the church, which goes back to the early church fathers. Open theism is typically advanced as a biblically motivated and logically consistent theology of human and divine freedom (in the libertarian sense), with an emphasis on what this means for the content of God's foreknowledge and exercise of God's power.

Open theist theologian Thomas Jay Oord identifies four paths to open and relational theology:
 following the biblical witness,
 following themes in some Christian theological traditions,
 following the philosophy of free will, and
 following the path of reconciling faith and science.
Roger E. Olson said that open theism triggered the "most significant controversy about the doctrine of God in evangelical thought" in the late 20th and early 21st centuries.

Exposition of open theism
In short, open theism posits that since God and humans are free, God's knowledge is dynamic and God's providence flexible. Whereas several versions of traditional theism picture God's knowledge of the future as a singular, fixed trajectory, open theism sees it as a plurality of branching possibilities, with some possibilities becoming settled as time moves forward. Thus, the future, as well as God's knowledge of it, is open (hence, "open" theism). Other versions of classical theism hold that God fully determines the future, entailing that there is no free choice (the future is closed). Yet other versions of classical theism hold that, though there is freedom of choice, God's omniscience necessitates God's foreknowing what free choices are made (God's foreknowledge is closed). Open theists hold that these versions of classical theism do not agree with the biblical concept of God; the biblical understanding of divine and creaturely freedom; and/or result in incoherence. Open theists tend to emphasize that God's most fundamental character trait is love and that this trait is unchangeable. They also (in contrast to traditional theism) tend to hold that the biblical portrait is of a God deeply moved by creation, experiencing a variety of feelings in response to it.

Comparison of open and Reformed theism
The following chart compares beliefs about key doctrines as stated by open theists and Calvinists after "the period of controversy" between adherents of the two theisms began in 1994. During this period the "theology of open theism… rocked the evangelical world".

Historical development
Contemporary open theists have named precursors among philosophers to document their assertion that "the open view of the future is not a recent concept," but has a long history.

The first known post-biblical Christian writings advocating concepts similar to open theism with regard to the issue of foreknowledge are found in the writings of Calcidius, a 4th-century interpreter of Plato. It was affirmed in the 16th century by Socinus, and in the early 18th century by Samuel Fancourt and by Andrew Ramsay (an important figure in Methodism). In the 19th century several theologians wrote in defense of this idea, including Isaak August Dorner, Gustav Fechner, Otto Pfleiderer, Jules Lequier, Adam Clarke, Billy Hibbard, Joel Hayes, T.W. Brents, and Lorenzo D. McCabe. Contributions to this defense increased as the century drew to a close.

The dynamic omniscience view has been affirmed by a number of non Christians as well: Cicero (1st century BC) Alexander of Aphrodisias (2nd century) and Porphyry (3rd century). God's statement to Abraham “Now I know that you fear me” (Gen 22:12) was much discussed by Medieval Jewish theologians. Two significant Jewish thinkers who affirmed dynamic omniscience as the proper interpretation of the passage were Ibn Ezra (12th century) and Gersonides (14th century).

Sergei Bulgakov, an early-20th-century Russian Orthodox priest and theologian advocated the use of the term panentheism, which articulated a necessary link between God and creation as consequence of God's free love and not as a natural necessity. His sophiology has sometimes been seen as a precursor to 'open theism'.

Millard Erickson belittles such precursors to open theism as "virtually unknown or unnoticed."

After 1980
The term "open theism" was introduced in 1980 with theologian Richard Rice's book The Openness of God: The Relationship of Divine Foreknowledge and Human Free Will. The broader articulation of open theism was given in 1994, when five essays were published by evangelical scholars (including Rice) under the title The Openness of God. Recent theologians of note expressing this view include: Clark Pinnock (deceased as of 2010), Greg Boyd, Thomas Jay Oord, John E. Sanders, Dallas Willard, Jürgen Moltmann, Richard Rice, C. Peter Wagner, John Polkinghorne, Hendrikus Berkhof, Adrio Konig, Harry Boer, Bethany Sollereder, Matt Parkins, Thomas Finger (Mennonite), W. Norris Clarke (Roman Catholic), Brian Hebblethwaite, Robert Ellis, Kenneth Archer (Pentecostal) Barry Callen (Church of God), Henry Knight III, Gordon Olson, and Winkie Pratney. A significant, growing number of philosophers of religion affirm it: Peter Van Inwagen, Richard Swinburne (Eastern Orthodox), William Hasker, David Basinger, Nicholas Wolterstorff, Dean Zimmerman, Timothy O'Connor, James D. Rissler, Keith DeRose, Richard E. Creel, Robin Collins (philosopher/theologian/physicist), J. R. Lucas, Vincent Brümmer, (Roman Catholic), Richard Purtill, Alan Rhoda, Jeffrey Koperski, Dale Tuggy, and Keith Ward. Biblical scholars Terence E. Fretheim, Karen Winslow, and John Goldingay affirm it. Others include writers Madeleine L'Engle and Paul C. Borgman, mathematician D.J. Bartholomew and biochemist/theologian Arthur Peacocke.

Philosophical arguments
Open theists maintain that traditional classical theists hold the classical attributes of God together in an incoherent way. The main classical attributes are as follows:
 All-good: God is the standard of moral perfection, all-benevolent, and perfectly loving.
 Simplicity: God has no parts, cannot be differentiated, and possesses no attribute as distinct from His being.
 Immutability: God cannot change in any respect.
 Impassibility: God cannot be affected by outside forces.
 Omnipresence: God is present everywhere, or more precisely, all things find their location in God.
 Omniscience: God knows absolutely everything: believes all truths and disbelieves all falsehoods. God's knowledge is perfect.
 Omnipotence: God can do anything because he is all-powerful and not limited by external forces.

Alleged contradictions in the traditional attributes are pointed out by open theists and atheists alike. Atheist author and educator George H. Smith writes in his book Atheism: The Case Against God that if God is omniscient, God cannot be omnipotent because: "If God knew the future with infallible certainty, he cannot change it – in which case he cannot be omnipotent. If God can change the future, however, he cannot have infallible knowledge of it".

Open theism also answers the question of how God can be blameless and omnipotent even though evil exists in the world. H. Roy Elseth gives an example of a parent that knows with certainty that his child would go out and murder someone if he was given a gun. Elseth argues that if the parent did give the gun to the child then the parent would be responsible for that crime. However, if God was unsure about the outcome then God would not be culpable for that act; only the one who committed the act would be guilty. This position is, however, dubious, as a parent who knows his child was probable, or likely, or even possibly going to shoot someone would be culpable; and God knew that it was likely that man would sin, and thus God is still culpable. An orthodox Christian might try, on the contrary, seek to ground a theodicy in the resurrection, both of Christ and the general resurrection to come, though this is not the traditional answer to evil.

Varieties of open theists
Philosopher Alan Rhoda has described several different approaches several open theists have taken with regard to the future and God's knowledge of it.

Voluntary Nescience: The future is alethically settled but nevertheless epistemically open for God because he has voluntarily chosen not to know truths about future contingents. It is thought Dallas Willard held this position.
Involuntary Nescience: The future is alethically settled but nevertheless epistemically open for God because truths about future contingents are in principle unknowable. William Hasker, Peter Van Inwagen, and Richard Swinburne espouse this position.
Non-Bivalentist Omniscience: The future is alethically open and therefore epistemically open for God because propositions about future contingents are neither true nor false. J. R. Lucas and Dale Tuggy espouse this position.
Bivalentist Omniscience: The future is alethically open and therefore epistemically open for God because propositions asserting of future contingents that they 'will' obtain or that they 'will not' obtain are both false. Instead, what is true is that they 'might and might not' obtain. Greg Boyd holds this position."

Criticism
Norman Geisler, a critic of open theism, addresses the claims that the Classical attributes were derived from the Greeks with three observations:
 The quest for something unchanging is not bad.
 The Greeks did not have the same concept of God.
 Philosophical influences are not wrong in themselves.

An open theist might respond that all such criticisms are misplaced. As to observation (1), it is not characteristic of open theists to say that the quest for something unchanging is bad. Indeed, open theists believe God's character is unchanging. As to observation (2), open theists do not characteristically say traditional forms of classical theism have exactly the same concept of God as the Greeks. Rather, they argue that they imported only some unbiblical assumptions from the Greeks. They also point to theologians of the Christian tradition who, throughout history, did not succumb so strongly to Hellenistic influences. As to observation (3), open theists do not argue that philosophical influences are bad in themselves. Rather, they argue that some philosophical influences on Christian theology are unbiblical and theologically groundless. Consider John Sanders' statement in The Openness of God (1980):

Opponents of open theism, both Arminians, and Calvinists, such as John Piper, claim that the verses commonly used by open theists are anthropopathisms. They suggest that when God seems to change from action A to action B in response to prayer, action B was the inevitable event all along, and God divinely ordained human prayer as the means by which God actualized that course of events.

They also point to verses that suggest God is immutable, such as:
 :  For I, the Lord, have not changed; and you, the sons of Jacob, have not reached the end.
 : God is not a man that He should lie, nor is He a mortal that He should repent. Would He say and not do, speak and not fulfill?
 :  And also, the Strength of Israel will neither lie nor repent, for He is not a man to repent."
 : [I] tell the end from the beginning, and from before, what was not done; [I] say, "My counsel shall stand, and all My desire I will do."

Those advocating the traditional view see these as the verses that form God's character, and they interpret other verses that say God repents as anthropomorphistic. Authors who claim this can be traced back through Calvin, Luther, Aquinas, Ambrose, and Augustine. Open theists note that there seems to be an arbitrary distinction here between those verses which are merely anthropopathic and others which form God's character. They also note that the immediate sense of the passages addressing God's inalterability ought to be understood in the Hebrew sense of his faithfulness and justice. In other words, God's love and character is unchanging; this, however, demands that His approach to people (especially in the context of personal relationship) be flexible.

Literary debate
In the early 18th century, an extended public correspondence flourished around the topic of open theism. The debate was incited by Samuel Fancourt's 1727 publication, The Greatness of Divine Love Vindicated. Over the next decade, four other English writers published polemical works in response. This led Fancourt to defend his views in six other publications. In his 1747 autobiography, in response to some who thought that this controversy had affected his career, Fancourt wrote, "Should it be suggested, that my religious principles were a prejudice unto me—I answer: so are those of every Dissenting Protestant in the [United] Kingdom with some, if he dares to think and to speak what he thinks." Fancourt also names other writers who had supported his views.

In 2005, a "raging debate" among evangelicals about "open or free-will theism" was in place. This period of controversy began in 1994 with the publication of The Openness of God. The debate between open and classical theists is illustrated by their books as in the following chart.

See also

David Basinger 
Gregory A. Boyd 
Robin Collins 
Conceptions of God
Samuel Fancourt 
Terence E. Fretheim 
William Hasker 
Libertarianism (metaphysics)
John Lucas (philosopher) 
Thomas Jay Oord 

Philosophical theology
Philosophy of space and time
Clark Pinnock 
John Polkinghorne 
Process theology
Richard Rice (theologian) 
John E. Sanders 
Richard Swinburne 
Keith Ward 
Dean Zimmerman

Footnotes

References

Sources
Pro

 Trinity and Process, G.Boyd, 1992
 "Satan & the Problem of Evil: Constructing a Trinitarian Warfare Theodicy", Greg Boyd (2001) 
 The Case for Freewill Theism: a Philosophical Assessment, David Basinger, 1996, InterVarsity Press, 
The Openness of God: The Relationship of Divine Foreknowledge and Human Free Will, Richard Rice, 1980, Review and Herald Pub. Association, 
 The Openness of God: A Biblical Challenge to the Traditional Understanding of God, Clark Pinnock editor, et al., 1994, InterVarsity Press , Paternoster Press (UK),  (followup to Rice book includes contribution from him)
The God Who Risks: A Theology of Providence, John Sanders, revised edition, 2007. InterVarsity Press, 
The Nature of Love: A Theology, Thomas Jay Oord, 2010. Chalice Press, 
God, Time, and Knowledge, William Hasker, 1998, Cornell University Press, 
 God of the Possible, Gregory A. Boyd, 2000 reprint, Baker Books, 
Most Moved Mover: A Theology of God's Openness (The Didsbury Lectures), Clark Pinnock, 2001, Baker Academic, 
Providence, Evil, and the Openness of God, William Hasker, 2004, Routledge, 
Creation Made Free: Open Theology Engaging Science, Thomas Jay Oord ed., 2009, Pickwick, 

Con

 God's Lesser Glory, Bruce A. Ware, 2000, Crossway Books, 
 Still Sovereign: Contemporary Perspectives on Election, Foreknowledge, and Grace, Thomas R. Schreiner and Bruce A. Ware (editors), 2000, Baker Academic, 
 Bound Only Once: The Failure of Open Theism, Douglas Wilson editor, et al., 2001, Canon Press, 
 No Other God: A Response to Open Theism, John M. Frame, P & R Publishing, 2001, 
 Consuming Glory: A Classical Defense of Divine-Human Relationality Against Open Theism, Gannon Murphy, Wipf & Stock, 2006, 
 Beyond the Bounds: Open Theism and the Undermining of Biblical Christianity, John Piper et al., 2003, Crossway Books, 
 What Does God Know and When Does He Know It?: The Current Controversy over Divine Foreknowledge, Millard J. Erickson, Zondervan, 2006, 
 How Much Does God Foreknow?: A Comprehensive Biblical Study, Steven C. Roy, InterVarsity Press, 2006, 
 The Benefits of Providence: A New Look at Divine Sovereignty, James S. Spiegel, Crossway Books, 2005, 

Multiple views

The Sovereignty of God Debate, D. Steven Long and George Kalantizis editors, 2009 Cascade Books, 
Perspectives on the Doctrine of God: 4 Views, Bruce Ware editor, 2008, Broadman and Holman Academic, 
 Divine Foreknowledge: 4 Views, James Beilby and Paul Eddy (editors), et al., 2001, InterVarsity Press, 
 God and Time: Essays on the Divine Nature, Gregory E. Ganssle and David M. Woodruff (editors), 2002, Oxford University Press, 
 God & Time: Four Views, Gregory E. Ganssle (editor), et al., 2001, InterVarsity Press, 
 Predestination & Free Will, David and Randall Basinger (editors), et al., 1985, Intervarsity Press, 
 Searching for an Adequate God, John Cobb and Clark Pinnock (Editors), et al., 2000, Wm. B. Eerdmans Publishing Company,

Further reading

 The Nature of Love: A Theology, Thomas Jay Oord (2010) 
 God, Foreknowledge, and Freedom, John Martin Fischer (editor), 1989, Stanford, 
 The Only Wise God: The Compatibility of Divine Foreknowledge & Human, William Lane Craig, 2000, Wipf & Stock Publishers, 
The Dilemma of Freedom and Foreknowledge, Linda Zagzebski, 1996, Oxford, 
 Eternal God : A Study of God without Time, Paul Helm, 1997, Oxford, 
 Time and Eternity: Exploring God's Relationship to Time, William Lane Craig, 2001, Crossway Books, 
 Time and Eternity, Brian Leftow, 1991, Cornell, 
 Travels in Four Dimensions: The Enigmas of Space and Time, Robin LePoidevin, 2003, Oxford,  * The Ontology of Time, L Nathan Oaklander, 2004, Prometheus Books, 
 Four-Dimensionalism: An Ontology of Persistence and Time, Theodore Sider, 2003, Oxford,  * Real Time II, Hugh Mellor, 1998, Routledge, 
 The Suffering of God: An Old Testament PerspectiveThe Suffering of God, Terence E. Fretheim, 1984, Fortress Press,

External links
 
  – A website maintained by Open Theist Boyd
 
  – magazine article

Evangelical theology
Christian terminology
Conceptions of God
God in Christianity
Christian theological movements
Protestantism-related controversies